Sergey Dychkov (born 8 August 1976) is a Belarusian boxer. He competed in the men's heavyweight event at the 1996 Summer Olympics.

References

External links
 

1976 births
Living people
Belarusian male boxers
Olympic boxers of Belarus
Boxers at the 1996 Summer Olympics
People from Rahachow
Heavyweight boxers
Sportspeople from Gomel Region
20th-century Belarusian people